The discography of Đorđe Balašević, Serbian and former Yugoslav singer-songwriter, contains 13 studio albums (11 as a solo artist), two live albums, four compilation albums and several singles.

Before his career as a solo-artist, Balašević was a member of bands Žetva (1977–1978) and Rani Mraz (1978–1981) with whom he recorded two studio albums.

Albums

Studio albums

Live albums

Compilation albums

Singles

Tribute albums

References

External links
Balasevic.info

Discographies of Serbian artists